Washington Township is one of fourteen townships in Cass County, Indiana, and one of the forty-six townships sharing the name in the state. As of the 2010 census, its population was 1,608.

History
Washington Township was organized in 1842. It was named for George Washington, first President of the United States.

Geography

Cities and towns
 Logansport (south quarter)

Unincorporated towns
 Anoka

Adjacent townships
 Miami (northeast)
 Tipton (east)
 Deer Creek (south)
 Washington Township, Carroll County (southwest)
 Clinton (west)
 Eel (northwest)

Major highways
  U.S. Route 35
  Indiana State Road 29
  Indiana State Road 218

Cemeteries
The township contains four cemeteries: Bruner, Ramer, Taber and West.

References
 United States Census Bureau cartographic boundary files
 U.S. Board on Geographic Names

External links

 Indiana Township Association
 United Township Association of Indiana

Townships in Cass County, Indiana
Townships in Indiana
Populated places established in 1842
1842 establishments in Indiana